The 2017 Montana wildfires were a series of wildfires that burned over the course of 2017.

Overview

Two fires alone burned over  each. The first was the Lodgepole Complex Fire in eastern Montana, which started on July 19 and burned over  before it was declared 93% contained two weeks later. Approximately 48 fires were burning , though some were under . The fire season began a month earlier than usual and months of June through August were the hottest and driest on record for Montana. On July 29, Montana had 11.87 percent of its total land listed as in exceptional drought, the largest percentage in the nation. In mid September, the eastern portion of the Going-to-the-Sun Road in Glacier National Park was closed by ice and snow in the Rockies, while simultaneously the western portion was closed due to wildfires.

Federal disaster assistance was requested by Governor Steve Bullock and FEMA granted funds for the Rice Ridge Fire near Seeley Lake, Montana, Alice Creek Fire near Lincoln, Montana, West Fork Fire near Libby, Montana, Highway 200 Complex in Sanders County, Montana and the Moose Peak Fire. Over $280 million had been spent on firefighting by early August.  A number of areas were subjected to evacuation orders, including most of the town of Seeley Lake.  By September 18, 2017, rain and snow had significantly slowed most fires, except for parts of far northwestern Montana, near Libby, where the West Fork Fire required some evacuation orders to remain in effect.

List of fires
Major fires of 2017 that consumed over  include the following:

 Over 
Lodgepole Complex Fire, public and private land 52 miles WNW of Jordan, 
Rice Ridge Fire, Lolo National Forest, near Seeley Lake, Montana, 

 Over 
Meyers Fire, Beaverhead National Forest/Deerlodge National Forest, 
Lolo Peak Fire, Lolo National Forest, 

Over 
Sapphire Complex Fire, Lolo National Forest, 
Little Hogback Fire, Lolo National Forest, 
Alice Creek Fire, Helena National Forest – Lewis and Clark National Forest, 
Tongue River Complex Fire, Custer National Forest/Gallatin National Forest, 
Liberty Fire, Flathead Indian Reservation, 
Sunrise Fire, Lolo National Forest, 
Highway 200 Complex Fire, Lolo National Forest/Kootenai National Forest, near Plains and Thompson Falls, Montana 
Caribou Fire, near Eureka, Montana, Kootenai National Forest, 
East Fork Fire, state land in Bears Paw Mountains, south of Havre, Montana, 
Strawberry Fire, near Dupuyer, Montana, Flathead National Forest, 
Scalp Fire, Flathead National Forest, 
West Fork Fire, Kootenai National Forest, 

Over 

Park Creek Fire, Helena National Forest/Lewis and Clark National Forest, 
Sprague Fire, Glacier National Park, 
Moose Peak Fire, Kootenai National Forest, 
Gibralter Ridge Fire, Kootenai National Forest, 
July Fire, public and private land near Zortman, 
Whetstone Ridge Fire, Beaverhead National Forest/Deerlodge National Forest, 
Reef Fire, Bob Marshall Wilderness, Flathead National Forest, 
Crucifixion Creek Fire, near Heart Butte, Montana, in the Badger-Two Medicine area, Helena National Forest/Lewis and Clark National Forest, 

Over 
Goat Creek Fire, Lolo National Forest, 
Crying Fire, public and private land 50 miles north of Winnett, 
Blacktail Fire, Lewis and Clark National Forest, 
Green Ridge Complex Fire, Bitterroot National Forest, 
Weasel Fire, Kootenai National Forest, 
Monahan Fire, Lolo National Forest, 
Blue Ridge Complex Fire, public and private land 39 miles NW of Jordan, 
Buffalo Fire, public and private land 31 miles SW of Broadus, 
Adair Peak Fire, Glacier National Park,  
Conrow Fire, Beaverhead National Forest/Deerlodge National Forest, 
Yooper Fire, SW Rural Culbertson/Richland County area, private and public land,

Further reading

References

External links
 

2017 Montana wildfires
2017 in Montana